Arthur Cyril Lewis (10 April 1909 – 1999) was a Welsh professional footballer who played as a winger.

References

1909 births
1999 deaths
People from Tonypandy
Sportspeople from Rhondda Cynon Taf
Welsh footballers
Association football wingers
Trealaw Rangers F.C. players
Treorchy Juniors F.C. players
Merthyr Town F.C. players
Tranmere Rovers F.C. players
Grimsby Town F.C. players
Plymouth Argyle F.C. players
English Football League players